"Per dire di no" is the first single from Alexia's sixth studio album Il cuore a modo mio and was released on CD in March 2003 (Sony Code 673593). The CD contained two tracks, with the second track being the 'reprise' version which would be included as a bonus track on the album.

The song was performed by Alexia at the Sanremo Music Festival 2003, where she had come second the year before with "Dimmi come…". This time she came first placed.

The title translates as 'To Say No', with the song describing a man that appeared to be perfect, but may not be so, with Alexia thus saying no and choosing to live a life of solitude.

Chart performance

References 

2003 singles
Alexia (Italian singer) songs
Songs written by Alexia (Italian singer)
Sanremo Music Festival songs
Sony Music singles